The men's ice hockey tournament at the 1932 Winter Olympics in Lake Placid, United States, was the fourth Olympic Championship, also serving as the sixth World Championships. Canada, represented by the Winnipeg Hockey Club, won its fourth consecutive Olympic gold medal and sixth consecutive World Championship. The United States took the silver medal and Germany claimed one of its three all-time hockey medals by taking the bronze (West Germany would win a bronze medal in 1976, and Germany's men's team would win silver in 2018). Overall, four teams participated, with only two European associations (Germany and Poland) making the trip due to the worldwide Great Depression. The other European teams instead played at the 1932 European Championship.

Medalists

Participating nations

A total of 48(*) ice hockey players from four nations competed at the Lake Placid Games:
 
 
 
 

(*) NOTE: Only players who participated in at least one game are counted.

Final tournament

Statistics

Average age
Team Germany was the oldest team in the tournament, averaging 25 years and 6 months. Gold medalists team Canada was the youngest team in the tournament, averaging 24 years and 5 months. Tournament average was 24 years and 9 months.

Top scorer

Final ranking

References

External links
 1932 Olympic Games report (digitized copy online)
 International Olympic Committee results database

 
1932 Winter Olympics events
1932
1932 in ice hockey
1932
Oly